Khaneh Shir (also Romanized as Khāneh Shīr; also known as Khanashir, Kūhanashahr, Kuhnashahr, and Kūneh Shahr) is a village in Mehmandust Rural District, Kuraim District, Nir County, Ardabil Province, Iran. At the 2006 census, its population was 441, in 107 families.

References 

Tageo

Towns and villages in Nir County